The 1984 NCAA Division I softball tournament was the third annual tournament to determine the national champion of NCAA women's collegiate softball for the 1984 NCAA Division I softball season. Held during May 1984, sixteen Division I college softball teams contested the NCAA tournament's first round. Featuring eight regionals with two teams each, the winner of each region, a total of eight teams, advanced to the 1984 Women's College World Series in Omaha, Nebraska. The 1984 Women's College World Series was the third NCAA-sponsored championship in the sport of college softball at the Division I level.  The event was held in Omaha, Nebraska from May 23 through May 29 and marked the conclusion of the 1984 NCAA Division I softball season.  UCLA won the championship by defeating  1–0 in the final game.

Regionals

UCLA qualifies for WCWS, 2–0

Northwestern qualifies for WCWS, 2–1

Cal Poly Pomona qualifies for WCWS, 2–0

Utah State qualifies for WCWS, 2–0

Nebraska qualifies for WCWS, 2–0

Adelphi qualifies for WCWS, 2–0

Fresno State qualifies for WCWS, 2–0

Texas A&M qualifies for WCWS, 2–1

Women's College World Series

Participants

UCLA

Game results

Bracket

Game log

Championship Game

All-Tournament Team
The following players were named to the All-Tournament Team

See also
NCAA Division I Softball Championship
Women's College World Series
NCAA Division II Softball Championship
NCAA Division III Softball Championship
College World Series

References

1984 NCAA Division I softball season
NCAA Division I softball tournament